Donbas is a region in eastern Ukraine and southwestern Russia.

Donbas or Donbass may also refer to:
 Donbass (film), a 2018 film directed by Sergei Loznitsa
 Donbass (ship), a Soviet World War II ship
 Donbas (Ukrainian command ship), a ship of the Ukrainian Navy
 Donbass Arena, a sports stadium in Donetsk, Ukraine
 Donbas State Technical University, a university in Alchevsk, Ukraine
 Donbas strategic offensive (August 1943), a Soviet strategic operation during World War II
 19916 Donbass, an asteroid
 HC Donbass, a Ukrainian ice hockey team
 HC Donbass-2, a former Ukrainian ice hockey team
 Battle of Donbas (disambiguation)
The Donbas oblasts of Ukraine, collectively:
Donetsk Oblast
Luhansk Oblast
The Donbas republics of Novorossiya (confederation), unrecognized separatist states in parts of the Donbas region:
Donetsk People's Republic
Luhansk People's Republic

See also
 
 
 Dombås, a village in Norway
 Donbassaero, an airline in Donetsk, Ukraine